The Hattiesburg Metropolitan Statistical Area is a metropolitan statistical area (MSA) in southeastern Mississippi that covers four counties - Covington, Forrest, Lamar, and Perry. The MSA’s principal city is Hattiesburg. The 2010 census placed the Hattiesburg MSA's population at 162,410, though estimates as of 2019 indicate the population has increased to 168,849. The area is part of the geographical region known as the Pine Belt, famous for its abundance of longleaf pine trees. The Hattiesburg MSA is part of the larger Hattiesburg-Laurel Combined Statistical Area.

Counties
Covington
Forrest
Lamar
Perry

Demographics
As of the census of 2000, there were 123,812 people, 45,999 households, and 31,372 families residing within the MSA. The racial makeup of the MSA was 72.13% White, 25.96% African American, 0.20% Native American, 0.65% Asian, 0.02% Pacific Islander, 0.36% from other races, and 0.69% from two or more races. Hispanic or Latino of any race were 1.18% of the population.

The median income for a household in the MSA was $30,746, and the median income for a family was $37,731. Males had a median income of $30,221 versus $20,464 for females. The per capita income for the MSA was $15,615.

Communities

Cities and towns

Beaumont
Hattiesburg (principal city)
Lumberton
New Augusta
Petal
Purvis
Richton
Sumrall

Census-designated places
Arnold Line
Rawls Springs
West Hattiesburg

Unincorporated places

Oak Grove
Baxterville
Brooklyn
Carnes
Fruitland Park
Hintonville
McLaurin
Oloh
Runnelstown

See also
Mississippi census statistical areas
List of metropolitan areas in Mississippi
List of micropolitan areas in Mississippi
List of cities in Mississippi
List of towns and villages in Mississippi
List of census-designated places in Mississippi
List of United States metropolitan areas

References

 
Geography of Covington County, Mississippi
Geography of Forrest County, Mississippi
Geography of Lamar County, Mississippi
Geography of Perry County, Mississippi